Herbert Edward Soper (1865 – 1930) was an eminent British statistician, who worked with Karl Pearson. He was awarded the Guy Silver Medal of the Royal Statistical Society in 1930. He had an obituary in the Journal of the Royal Statistical Society.

References

External links
Obituaries and publications 

British statisticians
1865 births
1930 deaths